Difendere l'offensore overo La Stellidaura vendicante ("Vengeful Stellidaura"; Naples, 1674) is an opera by Francesco Provenzale. It is one of only two operas by Provenzale to survive.

The opera was a major success for Provenzale and continued in the repertoire.

Recording
 La Stellidaura vendicante – Stellidaura (mezzo-soprano) Jennifer Rivera; Armillo (countertenor) Hagen Matzeit; Armidoro (tenor) Bogdan Mihai; Orismondo (tenor) Carlo Allemano; Giampetro (bass) Enzo Capuano. Accademia Montis Regalis, Alessandro De Marchi (conductor); 2CDs, Deutsche Harmonia Mundi, Festwochen der Alten Musik May 2013

References

External links

"At Innsbruck Festival, Opera as It Is Rarely Seen Today" by George Loomis, The New York Times, 14 August 2013

1674 operas
Operas
Italian-language operas